Nada may be:
Buyang language, a Tai–Kadai language spoken in Guangnan and Funing counties, Yunnan Province, China by the Buyang people
Budibud language, one of the Kilivila languages (of the Austronesian language family), spoken on the tiny Lachlan Islands, east of Woodlark Island in Papua New Guinea